Patrick Patterson may refer to:

Patrick Patterson (basketball) (born 1989), American professional basketball player
Patrick Patterson (cricketer) (born 1961), retired Jamaican cricket player
Paddy Patterson (born 1998), Irish rugby union player

See also
Pat Patterson (disambiguation)